Sung-ha, also spelled Seong-ha, is a Korean masculine given name. Its meaning differs based on the hanja used to write each syllable of the name. There are 27 hanja with the reading "sung" and 24 hanja with the reading "ha" on the South Korean government's official list of hanja which may be registered for use in given names.

People with this name include:
Jo Sung-ha (born 1966), South Korean actor
Jeon Sung-ha (born 1987), South Korean footballer
Jeong Seongha (born 1996), South Korean YouTube celebrity
Joo Seong-ha, North Korean journalist who defected to South Korea

See also
List of Korean given names

References

Korean masculine given names